Mattupetty Dam (Madupetty Dam), near Munnar in Idukki District,  is a  storage concrete gravity dam built  in  the mountains of Kerala, India to conserve water for hydroelectricity. It has been a vital source of power yielding along with other such dams, huge revenue to the states. The large amount of perennially available water allows wild animals and birds to flourish. However salinity caused by irrigation and water-logging are of concern to environmentalists. Taluks through which release flow are Udumpanchola, Devikulam, Kothamangalam, Muvattupuzha, Kunnathunadu, Aluva, Kodungalloor and Paravur

Specifications
Latitude : 10⁰ 06′ 23 ” N
Longitude: 77⁰ 07′ 26” E
Panchayath : Madupetty
Village : KDH Village
District : Idukki
River Basin : Muthirapuzha
River : Muthirapuzha
Release from Dam to river : Muthirapuzha
Type of Dam : Concrete- gravity
 Classification : HH ( high Height)
 Full Reservoir Level ( FRL): EL 1599.59 m
 Full Reservoir Level ( FRL) : EL 1599.59 m
 Storage at FRL : 55.23 Mm3
 Height from deepest foundation : 83.35 m
 Length : 237.74 m
Spillway : Ogee type- 3 Nos. Radial gates, each of size 6.70 x 4.95 m

Munnar is located near the confluence of the mountain streams of Muthirappuzha River, Chanduvarai River and Kundale River.

The reservoir is also known to be one of the visiting grounds of elephants in the region.

Gallery

See also

 List of dams and reservoirs in India

References

External links

 , Kerela State Electricity Board Ltd.

Hydroelectric power stations in Kerala
Dams in Idukki district
Dams completed in 1953
1953 establishments in India
20th-century architecture in India